Methanogens are microorganisms that produce methane as a metabolic byproduct in hypoxic conditions. They are prokaryotic and belong to the domain Archaea. All known methanogens are members of the archaeal phylum Euryarchaeota. Methanogens are common in wetlands, where they are responsible for marsh gas, and in the digestive tracts of animals such as ruminants and many humans, where they are responsible for the methane content of belching in ruminants and flatulence in humans. In marine sediments, the biological production of methane, also termed methanogenesis, is generally confined to where sulfates are depleted, below the top layers. Moreover, methanogenic archaea populations play an indispensable role in anaerobic wastewater treatments. Others are extremophiles, found in environments such as hot springs and submarine hydrothermal vents as well as in the "solid" rock of Earth's crust, kilometers below the surface.

Physical description

Methanogens are coccoid (spherical shaped) or bacilli (rod shaped). There are over 50 described species of methanogens, which do not form a monophyletic group (since haloarchaea emerged from within them), although all known methanogens belong to Euryarchaeota.  They are mostly anaerobic organisms that cannot function under aerobic conditions, but recently a species (Candidatus Methanothrix paradoxum) has been identified that can function in anoxic microsites within aerobic environments. They are very sensitive to the presence of oxygen even at trace level. Usually, they cannot sustain oxygen stress for a prolonged time. However, Methanosarcina barkeri is exceptional in possessing a superoxide dismutase (SOD) enzyme, and may survive longer than the others in the presence of O2. Some methanogens, called hydrogenotrophic, use carbon dioxide (CO2) as a source of carbon, and hydrogen as a reducing agent.

The reduction of carbon dioxide into methane in the presence of hydrogen can be expressed as follows:

CO2 + 4 H2 → CH4 + 2H2O

Some of the CO2 reacts with the hydrogen to produce methane, which creates an electrochemical gradient across the cell membrane, used to generate ATP through chemiosmosis. In contrast, plants and algae use water as their reducing agent.

Methanogens lack peptidoglycan, a polymer that is found in the cell walls of Bacteria but not in those of Archaea. Some methanogens have a cell wall that is composed of pseudopeptidoglycan. Other methanogens do not, but have at least one paracrystalline array (S-layer) made up of proteins that fit together like a jigsaw puzzle.

Extreme living areas
Methanogens play a vital ecological role in anaerobic environments of removing excess hydrogen and fermentation products that have been produced by other forms of anaerobic respiration. Methanogens typically thrive in environments in which all electron acceptors other than CO2 (such as oxygen, nitrate, ferric iron (Fe(III)), and sulfate) have been depleted.  In deep basaltic rocks near the mid-ocean ridges, they can obtain their hydrogen from the serpentinization reaction of olivine as observed in the hydrothermal field of Lost City.

The thermal breakdown of water and water radiolysis are other possible sources of hydrogen.

Methanogens are key agents of remineralization of organic carbon in continental margin sediments and other aquatic sediments with high rates of sedimentation and high sediment organic matter.  Under the correct conditions of pressure and temperature, biogenic methane can accumulate in massive deposits of methane clathrates, which account for a significant fraction of organic carbon in continental margin sediments and represent a key reservoir of a potent greenhouse gas.

Methanogens have been found in several extreme environments on Earth – buried under kilometres of ice in Greenland and living in hot, dry desert soil. They are known to be the most common archaebacteria in deep subterranean habitats. Live microbes making methane were found in a glacial ice core sample retrieved from about three kilometres under Greenland by researchers from the University of California, Berkeley. They also found a constant metabolism able to repair macromolecular damage, at temperatures of 145 to –40 °C.

Another study has also discovered methanogens in a harsh environment on Earth. Researchers studied dozens of soil and vapour samples from five different desert environments in Utah, Idaho and California in the United States, and in Canada and Chile. Of these, five soil samples and three vapour samples from the vicinity of the Mars Desert Research Station in Utah were found to have signs of viable methanogens.

Some scientists have proposed that the presence of methane in the Martian atmosphere may be indicative of native methanogens on that planet. In June 2019, NASA's Curiosity rover detected methane, commonly generated by underground microbes such as methanogens, which signals possibility of life on Mars.

Closely related to the methanogens are the anaerobic methane oxidizers, which utilize methane as a substrate in conjunction with the reduction of sulfate and nitrate. Most methanogens are autotrophic producers, but those that oxidize CH3COO− are classed as chemotroph instead.

Comparative genomics and molecular signatures

Comparative proteomic analysis has led to the identification of 31 signature proteins which are specific for methanogens (also known as Methanoarchaeota). Most of these proteins are related to methanogenesis, and they could serve as potential molecular markers for methanogens. Additionally, 10 proteins found in all methanogens which are shared by Archaeoglobus, suggest that these two groups are related. In phylogenetic trees, methanogens are not monophyletic and they are generally split into three clades. Hence, the unique shared presence of large numbers of proteins by all methanogens could be due to lateral gene transfers. Additionally, more recent novel proteins associated with sulfide trafficking have been linked to methanogen archaea. More proteomic analysis is needed to further differentiate specific genera within the methanogen class and reveal novel pathways for methanogenic metabolism.

Modern DNA or RNA sequencing approaches has elucidated several genomic markers specific to several groups of methanogens. One such finding isolated nine methanogens from genus Methanoculleus and found that there were at least 2 trehalose synthases genes that were found in all nine genomes. Thus far, the gene has been observed only in this genus, therefore it can be used as a marker to identify the archaea Methanoculleus. As sequencing techniques progress and databases become populated with an abundance of genomic data, a greater number of strains and traits can be identified, but many genera have remained understudied. For example, halophilic methanogens are potentially important microbes for carbon cycling in coastal wetland ecosystems but seem to be greatly understudied. One recent publication isolated a novel strain from genus Methanohalophilus which resides in sulfide-rich seawater. Interestingly, they have isolated several portions of this strain's genome that are different from other isolated strains of this genus (Methanohalophilus mahii, Methanohalophilus halophilus, Methanohalophilus portucalensis, Methanohalophilus euhalbius). Some differences include a highly conserved genome, sulfur and glycogen metabolisms and viral resistance. Genomic markers consistent with the microbes environment have been observed in many other cases. One such study found that methane producing archaea found in hydraulic fracturing zones had genomes which varied with vertical depth. Subsurface and surface genomes varied along with the constraints found in individual depth zones, though fine-scale diversity was also found in this study. It is important to recognize that genomic markers pointing at environmentally relevant factors are often non-exclusive. A survey of Methanogenic Thermoplasmata has found these organisms in human and animal intestinal tracts. This novel species was also found in other methanogenic environments such as wetland soils, though the group isolated in the wetlands did tend to have a larger number of genes encoding for anti-oxidation enzymes that were not present in the same group isolated in the human and animal intestinal tract. A common issue with identifying and discovering novel species of methanogens is that sometimes the genomic differences can be quite small, yet the research group decides they are different enough to separate into individual species. One study took a group of Methanocellales and ran a comparative genomic study. The three strains were originally considered identical, but a detailed approach to genomic isolation showed differences among their previously considered identical genomes. Differences were seen in gene copy number and there was also metabolic diversity associated with the genomic information.

Genomic signatures not only allow one to mark unique methanogens and genes relevant to environmental conditions; it has also led to a better understanding of the evolution of these archaea. Some methanogens must actively mitigate against oxic environments. Functional genes involved with the production of antioxidants have been found in methanogens, and some specific groups tend to have an enrichment of this genomic feature. Methanogens containing a genome with enriched antioxidant properties may provide evidence that this genomic addition may have occurred during the Great Oxygenation Event. In another study, three strains from the lineage Thermoplasmatales isolated from animal gastro-intestinal tracts revealed evolutionary differences. The eukaryotic-like histone gene which is present in most methanogen genomes was not present, eluding to evidence that an ancestral branch was lost within Thermoplasmatales and related lineages. Furthermore, the group Methanomassiliicoccus has a genome which appears to have lost many common genes coding for the first several steps of methanogenesis. These genes appear to have been replaced by genes coding for a novel methylated methogenic pathway. This pathway has been reported in several types of environments, pointing to non-environment specific evolution, and may point to an ancestral deviation.

Metabolism

Methane production 
Methanogens are known to produce methane from substrates such as H2/CO2, acetate, formate, methanol and methylamines in a process called methanogenesis. Different methanogenic reactions are catalyzed by unique sets of enzymes and coenzymes. While reaction mechanism and energetics vary between one reaction and another, all of these reactions contribute to net positive energy production by creating ion concentration gradients that are used to drive ATP synthesis. The overall reaction for H2/CO2 methanogenesis is:

CO2 + 4 H2 -> CH4 + 2 H2O (∆G˚’ = -134 kJ/mol CH4)

Well-studied organisms that produce methane via H2/CO2 methanogenesis include Methanosarcina barkeri, Methanobacterium thermoautotrophicum, and Methanobacterium wolfei. These organisms are typically found in anaerobic environments.

In the earliest stage of H2/CO2 methanogenesis, CO2 binds to methanofuran (MF) and is reduced to formyl-MF. This endergonic reductive process (∆G˚’= +16 kJ/mol) is dependent on the availability of H2 and is catalyzed by the enzyme formyl-MF dehydrogenase.

CO2 + H2 + MF -> HCO-MF + H2O

The formyl constituent of formyl-MF is then transferred to the coenzyme tetrahydromethanopterin (H4MPT) and is catalyzed by a soluble enzyme known as formyl transferase.  This results in the formation of formyl-H4MPT.

HCO-MF + H4MPT -> HCO-H4MPT + MF

Formyl-H4MPT is subsequently reduced to methenyl-H4MPT. Methenyl-H4MPT then undergoes a one-step hydrolysis followed by a two-step reduction to methyl-H4MPT. The two-step reversible reduction is assisted by coenzyme F420 whose hydride acceptor spontaneously oxidizes. Once oxidized, F420’s electron supply is replenished by accepting electrons from H2. This step is catalyzed by methylene H4MPT dehydrogenase.

HCO-H4MPT + H+ -> CH-H4MPT+ + H2O (Formyl-H4MPT reduction)

CH-H4MPT+ + F420H2 -> CH2=H4MPT  + F420 + H+(Methenyl-H4MPT hydrolysis)

CH2=H4MPT + H2 -> CH3-H4MPT + H+(H4MPT reduction)

Next, the methyl group of methyl-M4MPT is transferred to coenzyme M via a methyltransferase-catalyzed reaction.

CH3-H4MPT + HS-CoM -> CH3-S-CoM + H4MPT

The final step of H2/CO2 methanogenic involves methyl-coenzyme M reductase and two coenzymes: N-7 mercaptoheptanoylthreonine phosphate (HS-HTP) and coenzyme F430. HS-HTP donates electrons to methyl-coenzyme M allowing the formation of methane and mixed disulfide of HS-CoM. F430, on the other hand, serves as a prosthetic group to the reductase. H2 donates electrons to the mixed disulfide of HS-CoM and regenerates coenzyme M.

CH3-S-CoM + HS-HTP -> CH4 + CoM-S-S-HTP (Formation of methane)

CoM-S-S-HTP + H2 -> HS-CoM + HS-HTP (Regeneration of coenzyme M)

Wastewater treatment
Methanogens are widely used in anaerobic digestors to treat wastewater as well as aqueous organic pollutants. Industries have selected methanogens for their ability to perform biomethanation during wastewater decomposition thereby rendering the process sustainable and cost-effective.

Bio-decomposition in the anaerobic digester involves a four-staged cooperative action performed by different microorganisms. The first stage is the hydrolysis of insoluble polymerized organic matter by anaerobes such as Streptococcus and Enterobacterium. In the second stage, acidogens break down dissolved organic pollutants in wastewater to fatty acids. In the third stage, acetogens convert fatty acids to acetates. In the final stage, methanogens metabolize acetates to gaseous methane. The byproduct methane leaves the aqueous layer and serves as an energy source to power wastewater-processing within the digestor, thus generating a self-sustaining mechanism.

Methanogens also effectively decrease the concentration of organic matter in wastewater run-off. For instance, agricultural wastewater, highly rich in organic material, has been a major cause of aquatic ecosystem degradation. The chemical imbalances can lead to severe ramifications such as eutrophication. Through anaerobic digestion, the purification of wastewater can prevent unexpected blooms in water systems as well as trap methanogenesis within digesters. This allocates biomethane for energy production and prevents a potent greenhouse gas, methane, from being released into the atmosphere.

The organic components of wastewater vary vastly. Chemical structures of the organic matter select for specific methanogens to perform anaerobic digestion. An example is the members of Methanosaeta genus dominate the digestion of palm oil mill effluent (POME) and brewery waste. Modernizing wastewater treatment systems to incorporate higher diversity of microorganisms to decrease organic content in treatment is under active research in the field of microbiological and chemical engineering. Current new generations of Staged Multi-Phase Anaerobic reactors and Upflow Sludge Bed reactor systems are designed to have innovated features to counter high loading wastewater input, extreme temperature conditions, and possible inhibitory compounds.

Strains

Methanobacterium bryantii
Methanobacterium formicum
Methanobrevibacter arboriphilicus
Methanobrevibacter gottschalkii
Methanobrevibacter ruminantium
Methanobrevibacter smithii
Methanococcus chunghsingensis
Methanococcus burtonii
Methanococcus aeolicus
Methanococcus deltae
Methanococcus jannaschii
Methanococcus maripaludis
Methanococcus vannielii
Methanocorpusculum labreanum
Methanoculleus bourgensis (Methanogenium olentangyi and Methanogenium bourgense)
Methanoculleus marisnigri
Methanoflorens stordalenmirensis
Methanofollis liminatans
Methanogenium cariaci
Methanogenium frigidum
Methanogenium organophilum
Methanogenium wolfei
Methanomicrobium mobile
Methanopyrus kandleri
Methanoregula boonei
Methanosaeta concilii
Methanosaeta thermophila
Methanosarcina acetivorans
Methanosarcina barkeri
Methanosarcina mazei
Methanosphaera stadtmanae
Methanospirillium hungatei
Methanothermobacter defluvii (Methanobacterium defluvii)
Methanothermobacter thermautotrophicus (Methanobacterium thermoautotrophicum)
Methanothermobacter thermoflexus (Methanobacterium thermoflexum)
Methanothermobacter wolfei (Methanobacterium wolfei)
Methanothrix sochngenii

See also 
Extremophile
Hydrogen cycle
Methane clathrate
Methanogens in digestive tract of ruminants
Methanopyrus
Methanotroph

References

Anaerobic digestion
Gen
Archaea biology
Environmental microbiology